Westminster Academy is an Academy (publicly funded, semi-independent secondary school) located in London, England.
It is a co-educational school for pupils of 11+ years, and specialises in International Business and Enterprise. The school was created, along with nearby Paddington Academy, following the closure of North Westminster Community School.

History
Westminster Academy opened in September 2006 in temporary accommodation at Penfold Street in the London borough of the City of Westminster. This building was formerly the Marylebone Lower School site of North Westminster Community School. The school moved into new purpose-built premises in the summer of 2007. The new site is in the Westbourne Green area. The architects are Allford Hall Monaghan Morris.

Admissions
Westminster Academy is a comprehensive school which does not select pupils for admission. Admissions are administered by Westminster City Council through the Pan London Coordinated Admission System.

Westminster Academy is one of the most highly selective schools in London for their Sixth form, which currently offers the International Baccalaureate with the IBDP.

Notable alumni
 Khaleeda Bustamam, Crown Princess of Johor

See also
List of schools in the City of Westminster

References

External links
Westminster Academy review and photos by a+t magazine

Academies in the City of Westminster
Educational institutions established in 2006
Secondary schools in the City of Westminster
2006 establishments in England